The Southern Province is a portion of Proterozoic rock that ranges in age from 2.5 billion to 600 million years old. It represents a subdivision of the much larger Canadian Shield and forms the bedrock of portions of Ontario, Canada and the U.S. states of Michigan and Minnesota. A few significant geologic features are situated in the Southern Province, including the Midcontinent Rift System and the Sudbury Igneous Complex.

See also

Geology of Ontario

References

Proterozoic geology
Proterozoic North America
Geology of Ontario
Geology of Michigan
Geology of Minnesota
Geologic provinces of Canada
Geologic provinces of the United States